Malvav is a village in Mahuva Taluka of Bhavnagar district in Gujarat, India.  the 2011 Census of India, it had a population of 4,033 across 684 households.

References

Villages in Bhavnagar district